Joelle Taylor is a poet, playwright and author. She settled in London after hitchhiking there from Lancashire, where she was brought up.

Career
In 2000, Taylor was UK Performance Poetry slam Champion. She founded SLAMbassadors, the UK’s national youth slam championships, for The Poetry Society in 2001, and was its artistic director and national coach until 2018. Her collection, Songs My Enemy Taught Me was published by longtime collaborator Anthony Anaxagorou in 2017, through his company, Out-Spoken Press, and she has contributed the foreword to a children's poetry anthology published in 2017 by Otter-Barry Books. She was awarded a Fellowship of the Arts in 2016, and was long listed for the Jerwood Compton Poetry Fellowship in 2017.

She has toured the UK several times as a solo poet, as well as Australia and South East Asia in 2018.

She is the poet in residence at a number of schools, and performs and teaches across the country. She is a Subject for Study on the OCR GCSE English curriculum.

Her current emphasis is on working with groups of marginalised women globally, and on publishing their writing on her website, as well as on her online blog The Night Alphabet to coincide with her debut book of short stories of the same name.

She co-curates and hosts Out-Spoken, a monthly live poetry and music night currently in long term residence at London's Southbank Centre. She is commissioning editor of Out-Spoken Press for 2021–22.

Taylor won the 2021 T. S. Eliot Prize and a 2022 Polari Prize for C+nto: & Othered Poems.

Personal life
Taylor is based in London.

Political views
In December 2019, along with 42 other leading cultural figures, Taylor signed a letter endorsing the Labour Party under Jeremy Corbyn's leadership in the 2019 general election. The letter stated that "Labour's election manifesto under Jeremy Corbyn's leadership offers a transformative plan that prioritises the needs of people and the planet over private profit and the vested interests of a few."

Bibliography
Naming (play, 1994)
Whorror Stories (play, 1995)
Lesbians Talk Violent Relationships (Non-fiction, with Tracy Chandler, 1995, Scarlet Press
Whorror Stories II (play, 1996)
Lucid Johnston (play, 2000)
Ska Tissue (poetry, 2011, Mother Foucault Press
The Woman Who Was Not There (poetry, 2014, Burning Eye Books
Songs My Enemy Taught Me (poetry, 2017, Out-Spoken Press)
C+nto: & Othered Poems (poetry, 2021, Westbourne Press)

References

1967 births
Living people
English performance artists
English LGBT poets
English women poets
Writers from Lancashire
Slam poets